RTÉ News at One is a news and current affairs programme broadcast on RTÉ Radio 1. It airs Monday to Friday for 45 minutes at 1:00pm.

The programme is presented by Bryan Dobson.
An extended news bulletin takes up the first few minutes of the programme. This is then typically followed by a series of interviews. It finishes with sports news, business news, and a summary of news from around the regions.

Lengthened editions are also aired on the occasion of major breaking news stories such as general elections or referendums. As of February 2009, the programme had an audience of  335,000 listeners.

The first debate of the 2011 presidential election was broadcast on this programme.

References

External links
 Radio 1 site
 RTÉ News Site

Irish talk radio shows
RTÉ News and Current Affairs
RTÉ Radio 1 programmes